Saint Tryphon, Triphon or Trifon  may refer to:

Saints
Tryphon of Campsada, 3rd-century saint
Tryphon of Constantinople, Patriarch of Constantinople (928–931)
Tryphon of Pechenga, 16th-century saint
Tryphon of Vyatka, 16th-century Russian saint

Places
Saint-Triphon, Switzerland